Heortia vitessoides is a moth of the family Crambidae described by Frederic Moore in 1885. It is found in south-east Asia, including Fiji, Hong Kong, India, Taiwan, Thailand and northern Queensland in Australia.

The wingspan is about 30 mm. Adults have a pattern of black on pale yellow on the forewings. The hindwings are white with a broad black margin.

The larvae have been recorded feeding on Rhus and Aquilaria malaccensis. They live communally in a shelter made by joining a number of leaves together with silk. The larvae are pale green with a broad black line along each side.

Pupation takes place in the soil.

External links
Australian Insects

Odontiinae
Moths described in 1885